The IPSC Polish Rifle Championship is an IPSC level 3 championship held once a year by the Polish Sport Shooting Federation.

Champions 
The following is a list of current and previous champions.

Overall category

Senior category

References 

IPSC shooting competitions
National shooting championships
Poland sport-related lists
Shooting competitions in Poland